John Reber (February 1, 1858 – September 26, 1931) was a Republican member of the U.S. House of Representatives from Pennsylvania.

John Reber was born in South Manheim Township, Pennsylvania.  He graduated from the Eastman Business College in Poughkeepsie, New York, in 1875.  He taught school for several years and was later employed as a bookkeeper.  He served as deputy county treasurer of Schuylkill County, Pennsylvania from 1882 to 1884.  He was engaged in the manufacture of hosiery in Pottsville, Pennsylvania, from 1885 to 1917 and also interested in banking.

Reber was elected as a Republican to the Sixty-sixth and Sixty-seventh Congresses.  He served as Chairman of the United States House Committee on Mileage during the Sixty-seventh Congress.  He was not a candidate for renomination in 1922.

Following his congressional career, he resumed banking activities in Pottsville, eventually serving as president of the Reber Investment Co. He died in Pottsville and is interred in the Charles Baber Cemetery.

Sources

The Political Graveyard

American bankers
Burials at Charles Baber Cemetery
Politicians from Pottsville, Pennsylvania
1858 births
1931 deaths
Republican Party members of the United States House of Representatives from Pennsylvania